Mario Gómez Atanet (born 7 February 1981) is a Spanish former professional footballer who played as a right back.

Club career
In his first professional seasons, Madrid-born Gómez was first choice for hometown club Rayo Vallecano, which dropped from La Liga to the third division in just two years. He resumed his career in the second level, but could only play second-fiddle with both Elche CF and Córdoba CF.

In the summer of 2009, Gómez returned to division three by signing with another side from the Spanish capital, AD Alcorcón, and appeared sparingly as they promoted to the second tier for the first time ever, being subsequently released. Until the end of his career, he competed exclusively in lower league or amateur football.

References

External links

1981 births
Living people
Footballers from Madrid
Spanish footballers
Association football defenders
La Liga players
Segunda División players
Segunda División B players
Tercera División players
Rayo Vallecano B players
Rayo Vallecano players
RSD Alcalá players
Elche CF players
Córdoba CF players
AD Alcorcón footballers
Zamora CF footballers
CD Paracuellos Antamira players
Spain youth international footballers